Haenisch is a surname. Notable people with the surname include:

 Erich Haenisch (1880–1966), German sinologist
 Konrad Haenisch (1876–1925), German politician
 Walter Haenisch (1906–1938), German Marxist theoretician

See also
 Hanisch